Aal ( Single Person) is a 2014 Indian Tamil-language action thriller film written and directed by Ananda Krishnan and produced by Vidiyal Raju. It stars Vidharth, Vidiyal Raj, and Harthika Shetty in the lead roles. The background score and soundtrack were composed by Johan Shevanesh. The film, released on 19 September 2014, is a remake of the 2008 Hindi film Aamir. Aal received negative reviews from critics.

Plot
The film is about the life of an ordinary man facing an extraordinary situation in a single day. The story starts in Sikkim and travels with a grip towards the climax in Chennai. The film screens about how the youngsters are brought to the terrorism. Amir (Vidharth) is an intelligent professor who has already been in love with Meenakshi (Hardika Shetty), who works in Sikkim. When Amir goes back to Chennai, he is blackmailed into joining a terrorist organization that would hold his family and Meenakshi captive. Then, the extraordinary things happen in one day.

Cast

Production
The makers of the film noted that they managed to shoot the film in parts in Parry's Corner, making it the first film to do so in forty years. Similarly Anna Salai was used as a filming location for the first time in nearly twenty years. Scenes were also shot in Gangtok in Sikkim, a location never ever shown before in Tamil films.
The tagline of the film is ‘Who says a man writes his own destiny?’

Soundtrack
"Androru Naal"
"Dammal Dammal"
"My Name is Aamir" (Theme music)
"Hot Freeze" (Theme music)
"One Man's Blood" (Theme music)
"Oor Aal"
"Poda Po" (Singer: Hariharan)
"Red Suitcase" (Theme music)
"Leader" (Theme music)

References

External links
 

2014 films
2014 action thriller films
Films shot in Sikkim
2010s Tamil-language films
Tamil remakes of Hindi films
Indian action thriller films